The Venezuelan Adventist University (Instituto Universitario Adventista de Venezuela - IUNAV)  is a Seventh-day Adventist co-educational university located in Nirgua, Venezuela, and accredited by the Adventist Accrediting Association.

It is a part of the Seventh-day Adventist education system, the world's second largest Christian school system.

History
Founded in 1962 as Venezuela Adventist Secondary School, it later became the Vocational Institute of Venezuela, and finally in 1999 Venezuelan Adventist University was authorized by the government of Venezuela.  IUNAV offers undergraduate and graduate level degrees.

See also

 List of Seventh-day Adventist colleges and universities
 Seventh-day Adventist education

References

External links
 Official website

Universities and colleges affiliated with the Seventh-day Adventist Church